Cruwys  is a surname which today is mainly found in America, Australia, Canada, England, Ireland and Wales.  It is a variant form of Cruse; there are many others.

Notable people with this surname
Jill Cruwys (1943–1990), England cricketer
Margaret Cruwys (1894–1968), Devon historian
Robert Cruwys (1884–1951), cricketer

Fictional characters
 Cruwys Morchard, the alias of Clytie Potts in the 2006 novel A Darkling Plain

See also
Cruwys (disambiguation), other meanings including places with this word in the name

References

External links
The Cruwys One-Name Study
The Cruwys/Cruse/Crewes DNA project

Surnames of Norman origin